Robert Wharff is an American politician serving as a member of the Wyoming House of Representatives from the 49th district. Elected in November 2020, he assumed office on January 4, 2021.

Background 
Wharff was born and raised in Salt Lake City. He earned a Bachelor of Science degree in wildlife management from Utah State University. Since 2002, Wharff has worked as the executive director of Wyoming Sportsmen for Fish & Wildlife. Wharff was elected to the Wyoming House of Representatives in November 2020 and assumed office on January 4, 2021.

References 

Utah State University alumni
Republican Party members of the Wyoming House of Representatives
Year of birth missing (living people)
Living people
People from Salt Lake City